This is a list of all tornadoes that were confirmed by local offices of the National Weather Service in the United States in June 2010.

United States yearly total

June

Note: 9 tornadoes were confirmed in the final totals, but do not have a listed rating.

June 1 event

June 2 event

June 3 event

June 4 event

June 5 event

June 6 event

June 7 event

June 8 event

June 9 event

June 10 event

June 11 event

June 12 event

June 13 event

June 14 event

June 16 event

June 17 event

June 18 event

June 19 event

June 20 event (Plains)

June 20 event (Southeast)

June 21 event

June 22 event (Northeast)

June 22 event (Plains)

June 23 event

June 24 event (Northeast)

June 24 event (Plains)

June 25 event

June 26 event

June 27 event

June 28 event (Northeast)

June 28 event (South)

June 30 event
 These tornadoes were associated with Hurricane Alex.

See also
Tornadoes of 2010

References

 06
2010, 06
Tornadoes